Kurtuluş is a neighbourhood of Istanbul, Turkey.

Kurtuluş may also refer to:

 Kurtuluş (surname)
 Kurtuluş, Kuyucak, a town in Kuyucak district of Aydın Province, Turkey
 Kurtuluş, Mut, a village in Mut, Mersin Province, Turkey
 Kurtuluş, Seyhan, a mahalle in Seyhan, Adana Province, Turkey
 Kurtuluş, Silifke, a village in Silifke, Mersin Province, Turkey
 Kurtuluş SK, a football club in Istanbul
 SS Kurtuluş, a Turkish freighter ship 
 Kurtuluş: The Steamship That Carried Peace, a 2006 Turkish documentary film about the SS Kurtuluş